Chandra Prakash Deval is a Rajasthani poet and translator. He is also the convener of Rajasthani Advisory Council of Sahitya Akademi.

Translations
He has translated Bengali, Oriya, Gujarati, Hindi and Punjabi poems and books into Rajasthani. He has also translated Russian novelist Fyodor Dostoyevsky’s "Crime and Punishment" and Samuel Beckett’s play "Waiting for Godot".

Some of his poems are: "Pachhatava", "Mrityu Kisi ko Darati Nahin", "Mrityu se Mat Bhago" and "Vipathaga".

Awards

He has received Padma Shri in 2011 which happens to be the fourth highest civil honour given by the government of India. He has been awarded by Sahitya Akademi, Delhi for his poetry "Paagi" in 1979. He also has been awarded by Matrishri Kamal Goenka Rajasthani Literature award in 2009 for his poetry "Jhuravo" and his service to the Rajasthani literature. He has been conferred with the prestigious 23rd Bihari Puraskar for his poetic work 'Hirna ! Maun Saadh Van Charna' in the year 2013. He was also a recipient of Suryamal Mishran Shikhar Award(2004–05) for his work 'Udeek Puran'.

References

External links
 Kavita
 Vipathaga

Poets from Rajasthan
20th-century Indian translators
Rajasthani-language writers
Recipients of the Sahitya Akademi Award in Rajasthani
Living people
Recipients of the Padma Shri in literature & education
20th-century Indian poets
Year of birth missing (living people)
Translators of Fyodor Dostoyevsky
Charan